Aglaja Brix (born August 15, 1990) is a German actress. She is best known for playing the role of Vivien Overbeck in the TV detective series Die Pfefferkörner.

Biography
Brix was born and raised in Hamburg, Germany. After her debut in the detective series Doppelter Einsatz, Aglaja in 1999 joined the cast of Die Pfefferkörner, the role of Vivien "Vivi" Overbeck, who plays the role until 2005. From 2006 joins an acting career with that of model, posing for photographs and advertising campaigns.

Filmography

References

External links 
 Die Unsterblichen

1990 births
German film actresses
German television actresses
Living people